Mount Benson is a  high hill located about  north north-east of Robe in the south east of South Australia.  It was named in 1839 either by Governor Grey after a stockman employed by Charles Bonney or by Bonney himself.   Mount Benson itself is located both within the  locality  of the same name and the wine region of the same name.

References

Limestone Coast
Benson